Tullibigeal is a small farming community in the Central West region of New South Wales, Australia. It has a population of 233 in the 2016 census.

Etymology
The name is an Aboriginal word for "yarran wooden spears", yarran being a native species of acacia.

History
Tullibigeal Post Office opened on 1 April 1918. The railway was connected in 1917.

Demographics
In 2006, the population was both older and more homogeneous than the Australian average, with 31.2% of residents over 55 years compared to a national average of 24.3%, and only 3.1% born overseas compared to a national figure of 22.2%. More than 93% of residents spoke English at home.

In religion, Tullibigeal is predominantly Christian with the major religious denominations being Catholic (26.3%), Anglican (23.2%) and Uniting (22.4%). Only 6.4% of the population professed no religion, barely one third of the national average of 18.7%.

Economy

The main industries are sheep and cattle farming and grain cropping, collectively employing 62% of the Tullibigeal workforce. Median income was A$409 per week, significantly below the national average of $466.

Grain transport from Tullibigeal is provided via direct access to the rail line between Lake Cargelligo and Temora, with large grain silos located along the tracks near the town.

Notable residents
The town and surrounding district have produced several notable sportspeople including Barry Glasgow who played for Western Suburbs and North Sydney in the NSW Rugby League competition in the 1960s and 1970s.
Shannon Noll went to school at the local Central school. Grew up on a farm out of town. 
 Avon Garrard, otherwise known as Garry was the local policeman from 1953 to 1956 and later rose within the NSW Police Force to be Officer in Charge of Chatswood and then Hornsby but he is best known for getting the police out of their cars and back on the beat in touch with their local communities.

Gallery

References

External links

Towns in New South Wales
Towns in the Riverina
Towns in the Central West (New South Wales)
Lachlan Shire